Eucalyptus ovularis, commonly known as small-fruited mallee, is a species of mallee or a tree that is native to Western Australia.

Description
It has dark grey, rough and flaky bark at the base that becomes white-pinkish-grey and smooth above. The glossy, green adult leaves are alternately arranged. It blooms between September and May producing white flowers. The axillary unbranched inflorescences occur in groups of 9 to 13 buds per umbel.

Taxonomy
Eucalyptus ovularis was first formally described by the botanists Joseph Maiden and William Blakely in 1925 in the Journal and Proceedings of the Royal Society of New South Wales. The specific epithet (ovularis) is from Latin meaning "resembing an ovule".

Eucalyptus ovularis is part of the subgenus Symphyomyrtus section Dumaria in a sub-group of nine closely related species called series Ovulares. The rough barked members of this series include E. ovularis, E. aequioperta, E. brachycorys, E. myriadena and E. baudiniana. The smooth barked members include E. cyclostoma, E. cylindrocarpa, E. exigua and E. oraria.

Distribution
The tree has a scattered distribution in southern parts of the Goldfields-Esperance region between Ravensthorpe in the west, Coolgardie in the north to around Cape Arid in the east where it is found on plains growing in sandy or loamy soils over and around limestone.

See also
List of Eucalyptus species

References

Eucalypts of Western Australia
Trees of Australia
ovularis
Myrtales of Australia
Plants described in 1925
Taxa named by Joseph Maiden
Taxa named by William Blakely